The Director of Communication and Public Affairs (KOMDIR, previously Informationsdirektör, INFODIR) is the director of communications of the Swedish Armed Forces, in charge of public affairs. KOMDIR, which heads the Communications Department (Ledningsstabens kommunikationsavdelning, LEDS KOMM, previously called the Office of Communication and Public Affairs (Informationsstaben, INFOS), is an administrative position based at the Swedish Armed Forces Headquarters in Stockholm. The KOMDIR is part of the Defence Board (Försvarsmaktsledningen, FML), a group of the Supreme Commander's top commanders.

Tasks
The Director of Communication and Public Affairs shall lead the Swedish Armed Forces' military strategic communication within the framework of the Armed Forces' Strategic Direction (Försvarsmaktens Strategiska Inriktning, FMSI), the Armed Forces' Operational Plan (Försvarsmaktens verksamhetsplan, FMVP), the Defence Plan (Försvarsplanen, FP) and the Armed Forces Order (Försvarsmaktsorder, FMO). The task includes supporting the agency's command, commander directly subordinate to the Supreme Commander of the Swedish Armed Forces, the Chief of Army, Chief of Navy and the Chief of Air Force, the Chief of Communications and Information Systems (Ledningssystemchefen), the Chief of Defence Logistics, the Chief of Home Guard, the Assistant Chief of Armed Forces Training & Procurement and military regional commanders in public affairs matters.

The Director of Communication and Public Affairs is authorized to be a spokesperson for the Swedish Armed Forces and to be the publisher in charge responsible for the Armed Forces' magazine Försvarets Forum and the Armed Forces' website forsvarsmakten.se as well as the Armed Forces' accounts on social media. The Director of Communication and Public Affairs represents the Armed Forces in contacts with other authorities and organizations regarding communications issues.

The Director of Communication and Public Affairs must prepare documentation for the orientation of the communications service and marketing communications in the Armed Forces' Strategic Direction (Försvarsmaktens Strategiska Inriktning, FMSI), the Armed Forces' Operational Plan (Försvarsmaktens verksamhetsplan, FMVP), the Defence Plan (Försvarsplanen, FP) and the Armed Forces Order (Försvarsmaktsorder, FMO).

The Director of Communication and Public Affairs decides on development and management of the Swedish Armed Forces' trademark as well as name, profile and image, handbooks in the field of communications and on the Armed Forces' sponsorship.

The Director of Communication and Public Affairs is authorized to enter into agreements and contracts with government agencies, municipalities, regions, organizations and individuals.

Until 2020, KOMDIR/INFODIR was directly subordinate to the Supreme Commander of the Swedish Armed Forces. From 2020, KOMDIR reports to the Chief of Defence Staff.

Directors of Communication and Public Affairs

|-style="text-align:center;"
!colspan=8|Director of Communication and Public Affairs (Informationsdirektör, INFODIR)

|-style="text-align:center;"
!colspan=8|Director of Communication and Public Affairs (Kommunikationsdirektör, KOMDIR)

Footnotes

References

Military appointments of Sweden